FM is the original soundtrack to the 1978 film FM.  In the United States, the album reached the Top Five of Billboard's album chart and quickly earned a Platinum-certified disc.  It reached 37 in the UK charts.  Roger Nichols also won the 1979 Grammy Award for Best Engineered Album, Non-Classical for his work on the soundtrack.

Track listing
Side One
"FM (No Static at All)" - Steely Dan – 4:52
"Night Moves" - Bob Seger – 3:27
"Fly Like an Eagle" - Steve Miller Band – 3:04
"Cold as Ice" - Foreigner – 3:20
"Breakdown" - Tom Petty & The Heartbreakers – 2:44
"Bad Man" - Randy Meisner – 2:38
Side Two (Order of songs on inside jacket show side three songs before side two songs)
"Life in the Fast Lane" - Eagles – 4:46
"Do It Again" - Steely Dan – 5:54
"Lido Shuffle" - Boz Scaggs – 3:42
"More Than a Feeling" - Boston – 4:45
Side Three
"Tumbling Dice" - Linda Ronstadt – 4:51 (Live Version)
"Poor, Poor Pitiful Me" - Linda Ronstadt – 4:15  (Live Version)
"Livingston Saturday Night" - Jimmy Buffett – 3:10
"There's a Place in the World for a Gambler" - Dan Fogelberg – 5:41
"Just the Way You Are" - Billy Joel – 4:49
Side Four
"It Keeps You Runnin'" - The Doobie Brothers – 4:13
"Your Smiling Face" - James Taylor – 2:43
"Life's Been Good" - Joe Walsh – 8:05
"We Will Rock You" - Queen – 2:04
"FM - Reprise" - Steely Dan – 2:54

Track listing - cassette release
Side A
"FM (No Static at All)" - Steely Dan – 4:52
"Night Moves" - Bob Seger – 3:27
"Fly Like an Eagle" - Steve Miller Band – 3:04
"Cold as Ice" - Foreigner – 3:20
"Livingston Saturday Night" - Jimmy Buffett – 3:10
"Bad Man" - Randy Meisner – 2:38
"Life in the Fast Lane" - Eagles – 4:46
"Breakdown" - Tom Petty & The Heartbreakers – 2:44
"Just the Way You Are" - Billy Joel – 4:49
"Lido Shuffle" - Boz Scaggs – 3:42
"More Than a Feeling" - Boston – 4:45
Side B
"Tumbling Dice" - Linda Ronstadt – 4:51 (Live Version)
"Poor, Poor Pitiful Me" - Linda Ronstadt – 4:15  (Live Version)
"Do It Again" - Steely Dan – 5:54
"There's a Place in the World for a Gambler" - Dan Fogelberg – 5:41
"It Keeps You Runnin'" - The Doobie Brothers – 4:13
"Your Smiling Face" - James Taylor – 2:43
"Life's Been Good" - Joe Walsh – 8:05
"We Will Rock You" - Queen – 2:04
"FM - Reprise" - Steely Dan – 2:54

Charts

Weekly charts

Year-end charts

Sales and certifications

References

1978 compilation albums
1978 soundtrack albums
Comedy-drama film soundtracks
MCA Records compilation albums
MCA Records soundtracks